The 2017 CS Minsk-Arena Ice Star is a senior international figure skating competition to be held in October 2017 in Minsk, Belarus. It is part of the 2017–18 ISU Challenger Series. Medals will be awarded in the disciplines of men's singles, ladies' singles, pair skating, and ice dance.

Entries 
The International Skating Union published the full preliminary list of entries on 3 October 2017.

Results

Men

Ladies

Pairs

Ice dance

References

Citations

External links 
 2017 CS Minsk-Arena Ice Star at the International Skating Union

Ice Star
CS Minsk-Arena Ice Star
2017 in Belarusian sport
International figure skating competitions hosted by Belarus